Eagle Township is one of the sixteen townships of Brown County, Ohio, United States. The 2010 census found 1,344 people in the township.

Geography
Located in the northeastern corner of the county, it borders the following townships:
Concord Township, Highland County - northeast
Winchester Township, Adams County - east
Jackson Township - south
Franklin Township - southwest corner
Washington Township - west
Whiteoak Township, Highland County - northwest

No municipalities are located in Eagle Township.

Name and history
Statewide, other Eagle Townships are located in Hancock and Vinton counties.

Eagle Township was established in 1817.

Government
The township is governed by a three-member board of trustees, who are elected in November of odd-numbered years to a four-year term beginning on the following January 1. Two are elected in the year after the presidential election and one is elected in the year before it. There is also an elected township fiscal officer, who serves a four-year term beginning on April 1 of the year after the election, which is held in November of the year before the presidential election. Vacancies in the fiscal officership or on the board of trustees are filled by the remaining trustees.

References

External links
County website
"Gist Settlements", Ohio History Central

Townships in Brown County, Ohio
1817 establishments in Ohio
Populated places established in 1817
Townships in Ohio